Leons is a small village in Leeuwarden municipality in the Dutch province of Friesland. Situated in pastoral farming country, the village had around 26 inhabitants in January 2017.

History
The settlement was first mentioned in the 13th century as Leonghem, and means "settlement of the people of Lieuwe (person)". The Dutch Reformed church dates from the 14th century. The tower was constructed in the 19th century. In 1840, Leons was home to 38 people.

Before 2018, the village was part of the Littenseradiel municipality and before 1984 it belonged to Baarderadeel municipality.

Gallery

References

External links

Leeuwarden
Populated places in Friesland